Elbląg Voivodeship was a unit of administrative division and local government in Poland from 1975 to 1998, superseded by the Pomeranian Voivodeship and the Warmian-Masurian Voivodeship. Its capital city was Elbląg.

Major cities and towns (population in 1995)
 Elbląg (128,700)
 Malbork (40,300)
 Kwidzyn (39,300)

See also
 Voivodeships of Poland

Former voivodeships of Poland (1975–1998)
 States and territories established in 1975